Caden Stafford (born September 28, 2003) is an American soccer player who plays as a forward for Maryland Terrapins.

Career

Youth
Stafford joined the Philadelphia Union academy in 2019 from the Syracuse Development Academy. He made his debut with the club's USL Championship affiliate side, Philadelphia Union II, on August 5, 2020. He appeared as a 82nd-minute substitute during a 3–2 win over New York Red Bulls II.

College & USL League Two
In 2021, Stafford attended the University of Maryland, College Park to play college soccer.

Stafford also appeared for USL League Two side Ocean City Nor'easters in 2021, scoring a single goal in four regular season and two playoff appearances.

Career statistics

Club

References

External links
Philadelphia Union at the USSDA website

2003 births
Living people
American soccer players
Association football forwards
Philadelphia Union II players
Maryland Terrapins men's soccer players
Ocean City Nor'easters players
USL Championship players
USL League Two players
Soccer players from New York (state)
People from Cincinnatus, New York